House Armed Services Subcommittee on Military Personnel is a subcommittee of the House Armed Services Committee in the United States House of Representatives.

It is currently Chaired by Democrat Jackie Speier of California and its Ranking Member is Republican Jim Banks of Indiana.

Jurisdiction
The Military Personnel Subcommittee exercises oversight and legislative jurisdiction over:

 Military personnel policy
 Reserve component integration and employment issues
 Military health care
 Military education
 POW/MIA issues
 Morale, Welfare and Recreation issues and programs

Members, 117th Congress

Historical membership rosters

115th Congress

116th Congress

See also
U.S. Senate Armed Services Subcommittee on Personnel

References

External links
House Armed Services Committee 
Subcommitee page

Armed Services Military Personnel